Pakadiya Chikani (Nepali: पकडिया चिकनि)  is a village (Ward) Ward No 6 of Pachrauta Municipality and in Bara District, in the Narayani Zone of south-eastern Nepal. At the time of the 2011 Nepal census it had a population of 5013 (Male - 2634 and Female 2379) persons living in 672 individual households.

Pakadiya Chikani is a village (ward) belongs to Pachrauta Municipality in Bara District of Narayani Zone of Province 2. In south there is Beldari (Ward No. 4) while in North Benauli (Ward No. 7) of same Pachrauta Municipality and in east Piparpati Bazar and Bisunpur (Ward No. 6) while in West Tiwar River with India Boarder. Pakadiya Chikani is good enough in access of natural resources that includes diverse flora, fauna, fresh water river, community forests, community garden and plain fertile for agriculture. Also a great access of man made resources like dam (nahar) water supply for irrigation and almost 24 hrs X 7 days electricity in all over the agricultural lands for irrigation of these land.

Ward No. 6 
Ward Office: - Pakadiya Chikani

Includes Vdc: - Pakiya Chikani (Ward 2 & 7)

Total Area: - 4.18 (Square K.M.)

Total Population: - 3360 (2011)

Ward Contact Person Name, Post, and Contact

References

External links
UN map of the municipalities of Bara District

Populated places in Bara District